Margaret Kerr Hosmer (December 1, 1830 – February 3, 1897) was an American writer and novelist who primarily wrote for young readers.

Hosmer was born and attended school in Philadelphia, Pennsylvania, and later moved to San Francisco where she served a principal of a public school, and also at one point edited The Golden Era with Bret Harte.  She married Granville Hosmer in 1853.  She returned to Philadelphia in 1860, and was back to San Francisco in 1864.  She died from pneumonia in Philadelphia in February 1897.

Bibliography
Hosmer contributed to magazines, published novels, and wrote over 25 books for young readers.  She also published serials under the name Grace Thornton.

 The Morrisons (1863)
 Blance Gilroy (1864)
 Ten Years of a Lifetime (1866)
 Little Rosie series (1869)
 Rich and Poor (1870)
 The Sin of the Father (1872)
 A Rough Boy's Story (1873)

References

External links
 
 

1830 births
1897 deaths
19th-century American women writers
Writers from Philadelphia
19th-century American writers